Ercan Albay (born 4 December 1954) is a retired Turkish football midfielder and later manager.

References

1954 births
Living people
Turkish footballers
Samsunspor footballers
Adana Demirspor footballers
Adanaspor footballers
Giresunspor footballers
Association football midfielders
Turkey under-21 international footballers
Turkish football managers
Mersin İdman Yurdu managers
Adana Demirspor managers
Adanaspor managers